The 2012 New York Jets season was the franchise's 43rd season in the National Football League, the 53rd overall and the fourth under head coach Rex Ryan. The Jets failed to improve their 8–8 record from 2011 and were eliminated from postseason contention for the second straight season.

2012 was overall one of the most turbulent seasons in franchise history. The team was distracted by increased media presence during the off-season due to a quarterback controversy between incumbent starter Mark Sanchez and trade acquisition Tim Tebow. In addition, numerous blunders on and off the field as well as injuries often led to sloppy play, and the team was compared to a "circus", with the infamous "Butt fumble" play on Thanksgiving considered the low-point of the season. The Jets' offense scored 281 points, ranking them 30th in the league, while the defense was ranked 8th best in the league.

Transactions

Coaching changes
The contracts of wide receivers coach Henry Ellard, outside linebackers coach Jeff Weeks and assistant head coach/offensive line coach Bill Callahan expired after the conclusion of the 2011 season and subsequently they were not retained. Ellard and Callahan, when offered contract extensions prior to the expiration of their contracts, refused to re-sign.
Mike Smith was promoted from his position as a defensive intern to the outside linebackers coach, replacing Jeff Weeks. Smith later left the team to become the linebackers coach and co-coordinator at West Virginia. He returned to the Jets two weeks later after discovering his responsibilities with West Virginia were not the same as the team had first indicated.
Tony Sparano was hired as the new offensive coordinator, replacing Brian Schottenheimer on January 11, 2012.
Sanjay Lal was hired as the new wide receivers coach on January 13, 2012.
Dave DeGuglielmo was hired as the new offensive line coach on January 24, 2012.
On February 13, the team named Karl Dunbar as the new defensive line coach. In addition strength and conditioning coaching assistants Justus Galac and Paul Ricci were hired.
Defensive line coach Mark Carrier left the team to accept the position as the Cincinnati Bengals' defensive backs coach.

Arrivals

The Jets signed Michael Campbell, Dedrick Epps, Dexter Jackson, Dennis Landolt, Julian Posey, and Eron Riley to reserve/future contracts on January 2, 2012.
The Jets signed Matt Kroul and John Griffin to reserve/future contracts on January 3, 2012.
The Jets signed Royce Adams and Travis Baltz to reserve/future contracts on January 6, 2012.
The Jets signed Eddie Jones to a reserve/future contract on January 9, 2012.
The Jets signed Matthias Berning to a reserve/future contract on January 12, 2012.
The Jets signed DaMarcus Ganaway to a reserve/future contract on January 17, 2012.
The Jets signed Trevor Canfield to a reserve/future contract on January 21, 2012.
The Jets signed Kris O'Dowd on March 13, 2012.
The Jets signed Chaz Schilens and Drew Stanton on March 16, 2012.
The Jets signed LaRon Landry on March 19, 2012.
The Jets re-signed Scotty McKnight on March 26, 2012.
The Jets signed Hayden Smith on April 3, 2012.
The Jets signed DeAngelo Smith and Jay Richardson on April 16, 2012.
The Jets re-signed DaMarcus Ganaway and signed undrafted free agents John Cullen, Marcus Dowtin, Donnie Fletcher, Damon Harrison, G. J. Kinne, Brian Linthicum, D'Anton Lynn, Ryan Steed, Donovan Robinson, and Brett Roy on April 29, 2012.
The Jets signed Josh Brown on May 1, 2012.
The Jets signed Derek Chard on May 2, 2012.
The Jets signed Royce Pollard on May 5, 2012.
The Jets signed Matt Simms and Fred Koloto on May 6, 2012.
The Jets signed Yeremiah Bell and Terrence Campbell on May 18, 2012.
The Jets signed Fui Vakapuna on May 22, 2012.
The Jets signed Stephon Heyer and Ray Willis on May 29, 2012.
The Jets signed Tarren Lloyd on May 31, 2012.
The Jets signed Raymond Webber on June 19, 2012.
The Jets signed Matt Hardison on June 22, 2012.
The Jets signed Paul Cornick on July 12, 2012.
The Jets signed Devon Torrence on August 1, 2012.
The Jets signed Wes Kemp, Chris Forcier and Marcus Lott on August 2, 2012.
The Jets signed Damario Ambrose on August 3, 2012.
The Jets signed Joseph Collins and Stanley Arukwe on August 7, 2012.
The Jets claimed Jeremy Stewart off waivers on August 8, 2012.
The Jets signed LeQuan Lewis on August 15, 2012.
The Jets claimed Spencer Lanning off waivers on August 28, 2012.
The Jets claimed Isaako Aaitui, Clyde Gates, and Konrad Reuland off waivers and signed Paul Cornick, Marcus Dowtin, Donnie Fletcher, Royce Pollard, Ricky Sapp, Hayden Smith, and Jordan White to the practice squad on September 1, 2012.
The Jets signed Antonio Allen to the practice squad on September 2, 2012.
The Jets signed Marcus Dixon and Robert Malone on September 4, 2012.
The Jets signed LeQuan Lewis to the practice squad on September 5, 2012.
The Jets re-signed Ricky Sapp to the practice squad on September 11, 2012.
The Jets signed Stanley Arukwe to the practice squad on September 12, 2012.

The Jets signed Dedrick Epps off the Chicago Bears' practice squad on September 14, 2012.
The Jets re-signed Royce Pollard to the practice squad on September 17, 2012.
The Jets promoted Donnie Fletcher to the active roster on September 22, 2012.
The Jets signed Patrick Turner and Bryan Thomas on September 24, 2012.
The Jets signed Jonathan Grimes to the active roster and Donnie Fletcher to the practice squad on September 25, 2012.
The Jets signed Dennis Landolt to the practice squad on September 27, 2012.
The Jets signed Darrin Walls to the practice squad on September 28, 2012.
The Jets signed Aaron Berry on October 1, 2012.
The Jets signed Lex Hilliard to the active roster and Jordan White to the practice squad on October 2, 2012.
The Jets signed Jason Hill on October 3, 2012.
The Jets signed Daniel Muir on October 10, 2012.
The Jets promoted Antonio Allen from the practice squad on October 12, 2012.
The Jets signed Matt Hardison to the practice squad on October 16, 2012.
The Jets promoted Marcus Dowtin from the practice squad and signed Donnie Fletcher to the practice squad on October 17, 2012.
The Jets signed John Griffin and D. J. Bryant to the practice squad on November 5, 2012.
The Jets signed Hayworth Hicks and re-signed Jason Hill on November 6, 2012.
The Jets signed Kahlil Bell on November 13, 2012.
The Jets promoted Jordan White, Darrin Walls, and Donnie Fletcher to the active roster from the practice squad on November 22, 2012.
The Jets signed Mardy Gilyard to the active roster and Dennis Landolt and Eddie McGee to the practice squad on November 28, 2012.
The Jets signed Jacquies Smith to the practice squad on December 3, 2012.
The Jets signed Tevita Finau to the practice squad on December 5, 2012.
The Jets promoted Antonio Allen to the active roster and re-signed Donnie Fletcher to the practice squad on December 6, 2012.
The Jets signed Titus Ryan and JoJo Dickson to the practice squad on December 10, 2012.
The Jets claimed Braylon Edwards off waivers on December 11, 2012.

Departures
The Jets released Gerald Alexander and Michael Campbell on March 14, 2012.
The Jets waived DaMarcus Ganaway on April 3, 2012.
The Jets waived Taylor Boggs on April 12, 2012.
The Jets waived Logan Payne on May 1, 2012.
The Jets waived Ropati Pitoitua on May 2, 2012.
The Jets waived Trevor Canfield on May 3, 2012.
The Jets waived Kris O'Dowd on May 6, 2012.
The Jets waived DeAngelo Smith and Eddie Jones on May 22, 2012.
The Jets waived John Cullen on May 31, 2012.
The Jets waived Donovan Robinson on June 18, 2012.
The Jets waived Matthias Berning on June 19, 2012.
The Jets waived G. J. Kinne and Ray Willis on June 28, 2012.
The Jets waived Brian Linthicum on July 3, 2012.
The Jets placed Royce Adams on the injured reserve list on July 31, 2012.
The Jets waived Tracy Wilson and Fui Vakapuna on August 1, 2012.
The Jets waived Scotty McKnight and DaMarcus Ganaway on August 6, 2012.
The Jets waived Chris Forcier on August 7, 2012.
The Jets waived John Griffin on August 8, 2012.
The Jets waived Travis Baltz on August 12, 2012.
The Jets waived Devon Torrence on August 14, 2012.
The Jets released Stephon Heyer on August 20, 2012.
The Jets waived Dexter Jackson, Raymond Webber, LeQuan Lewis, Terrence Campbell, Marcus Lott, Derek Chard and, Matt Hardison on August 25, 2012.
The Jets released Josh Brown, waived/injured Josh Baker, and waived Damario Ambrose, Stanley Arukwe, Wes Kemp, and Jeremy Stewart on August 27, 2012.
The Jets waived Ryan Steed on August 29, 2012.
The Jets waived Terrance Ganaway, Royce Pollard, Jordan White, Hayden Smith, Paul Cornick, Ricky Sapp, Donnie Fletcher, Matt Simms, Joseph Collins, Eron Riley, Robert Griffin, Fred Koloto, Matt Kroul, Tarren Lloyd, Jay Richardson, Martin Tevaseu, Marcus Dowtin, Brett Roy, LeQuan Lewis, D'Anton Lynn, Julian Posey, and Spencer Lanning on August 31, 2012.
The Jets waived Antonio Allen, Marcus Dixon, and Dedrick Epps on September 1, 2012.
The Jets released Isaako Aaitui and T. J. Conley on September 4, 2012.
The Jets released Ricky Sapp from the practice squad on September 5, 2012.
The Jets waived Patrick Turner and released LeQuan Lewis from the practice squad on September 11, 2012.
The Jets released Royce Pollard from the practice squad on September 12, 2012.
The Jets released Stanley Arukwe from the practice squad on September 17, 2012.
The Jets released Bryan Thomas on September 22, 2012.
The Jets released Marcus Dixon and waived Dennis Landolt and Donnie Fletcher on September 24, 2012.
The Jets released Paul Cornick from the practice squad on September 27, 2012.
The Jets released Jordan White from the practice squad on September 29, 2012.
The Jets waived/injured Dedrick Epps on October 1, 2012.
The Jets waived Patrick Turner from the active roster and released Donnie Fletcher from the practice squad on October 2, 2012.
The Jets released John Connor on October 17, 2012.
The Jets waived Jonathan Grimes and Daniel Muir from the active roster and released Dennis Landolt from the practice squad on October 30, 2012.
The Jets waived Antonio Allen on November 6, 2012.
The Jets released Aaron Maybin on November 13, 2012.
The Jets waived Jason Hill and Marcus Dowtin on November 20, 2012.
The Jets waived Hayworth Hicks on November 27, 2012.
The Jets waived Donnie Fletcher from the active roster and released D. J. Bryant from the practice squad on December 4, 2012.
The Jets released Matt Hardison and Eddie McGee from the practice squad on December 10, 2012.
The Jets waived Kahlil Bell on December 10, 2012.
The Jets waived Mardy Gilyard on December 24, 2012.

Trades

To Jets
The Denver Broncos traded Tim Tebow and a 2012 seventh round pick for the Jets 2012 fourth and sixth round draft picks on March 21, 2012.
The Carolina Panthers traded Jeff Otah for an undisclosed draft pick on July 23, 2012. The trade was voided on July 31 after Otah failed to pass a physical with the team.
The St. Louis Rams traded Jason Smith for the Jets' offensive tackle Wayne Hunter on August 27, 2012.

From Jets
Drew Stanton was traded to the Indianapolis Colts along with a 2012 7th round draft pick on March 23, 2012, in exchange for a 2012 6th-round draft pick.

2012 Draft class

NOTES:
The Jets were awarded four compensatory selections after losing free agents Braylon Edwards, Drew Coleman, Steve Weatherford, Shaun Ellis, and Brad Smith.

Free agents

Preseason

Regular season

Schedule

Note: Intra-division opponents are in bold text.

Standings

Division

Conference

Staff

Rosters

Opening training camp roster

Week 1 roster

Final roster

Regular season results

Week 1: vs. Buffalo Bills

The Jets erupted to a 21–0 lead in the second quarter following two Mark Sanchez touchdown throws and a Jeremy Kerley punt return score.  Following Antonio Cromartie's interception return score and Sanchez' third touchdown (to Stephen Hill), Ryan Fitzpatrick, despite three interceptions, erupted to three consecutive touchdowns, but the Jets put the game away in a fourth quarter drive ending in a one-yard Shonn Greene touchdown run.

Tim Tebow, acquired from the Broncos amid heavy publicity about his presence with the Jets and the team's plans on how to utilize him, rushed five times for just eleven yards.

With their 6th straight win over the Bills, the Jets began their season 1–0.

Week 2: at Pittsburgh Steelers

The Jets traveled to Heinz Field for a rematch of the 2010 AFC Championship game against the Steelers.   The Jets limited the Steelers to just 68 rushing yards but Ben Roethlisberger tossed for 275 yards and two touchdowns.  With the loss, the Jets fell to 1–1.

Week 3: at Miami Dolphins

With the win, the Jets improved to 2–1. However, they lost star cornerback Darrelle Revis for the season as he suffered a torn ACL during the game.

Week 4: vs. San Francisco 49ers

After their Week 3 road win over their division rival Dolphins, the Jets headed home to face their first NFC Opponent of the season, the 49ers.  However, the Jets struggled in this game being shut out at home 34–0 by the 49ers.  This was the first time since 2010 that the team has been shut out at home since the Packers shut them out 9–0 that year.  With the huge shutout loss, the Jets fell to 2–2.

Week 5: vs. Houston Texans

The Jets stayed home for a game against the red-hot undefeated 4–0 Texans.  This game would mark the first time ever that the Jets have lost to the Texans, and as a result New York dropped to 2–3 on the season.

Week 6: vs. Indianapolis Colts

The Jets faced Colts rookie sensation Andrew Luck; they sacked him four times and intercepted him twice.   Shonn Greene and Joe McKnight combined to rush for 232 yards and three Greene touchdowns.   Mark Sanchez threw for just 82 yards but had two touchdowns, while Tim Tebow had one throw for 23 yards but was limited to seven rushing yards.

The huge win was the Jets' first win over the Colts without Peyton Manning since 1997.   They improved to 3–3 and a four-way tie in the AFC East.

Week 7: at New England Patriots

This game would determine who would be atop the AFC East. The Jets erased a 23–13 gap in the fourth quarter.  After a Dustin Keller touchdown catch Devin McCourty fumbled the kickoff.   Following back-to-back Nick Folk field goals, Tom Brady whipped the Patriots to the game-tying field goal in the final 1:37.  In overtime Stephen Gostkowski booted a 48-yard field goal; the Jets got the ball back but Sanchez was strip-sacked by Rob Ninkovich and Jermaine Cunningham, ending the game in a 29–26 Jets loss, allowing the Patriots to take 1st Place and dropping the Jets to 3–4.

Week 8: vs. Miami Dolphins

Despite losing rookie sensation Ryan Tannehill for the game after a first-quarter sack, the Dolphins raced to a 30–9 win, their fourth road win in the rivalry in their last five trips to New Jersey.  The Dolphins scored on a blocked goalline punt, then added touchdowns by Daniel Thomas and a short toss from Matt Moore to Anthony Fasano.  Sanchez managed a late touchdown to Chaz Schilens but the two-point throw to Dustin Keller failed.

Week 10: at Seattle Seahawks

The surging Seahawks under former Jets coach Pete Carroll limited the Jets to 185 total yards of offense and forced two fumbles.  Golden Tate caught a touchdown from Russell Wilson then took a reverse and threw to Sidney Rice for a fourth-quarter score.  The Jets only score came when Wilson was strip-sacked and Muhammad Wilkerson ran in a 21-yard touchdown.

It was the Jets' second straight loss to the Seahawks, and they fell to 3–6 and 0–2 against the NFC West.

Week 11: at St. Louis Rams

The Jets posted their sixth win in their last seven meetings against Jeff Fisher.  They picked off Sam Bradford once and forced two Rams fumbles.  The two teams combined for just 570 yards of offense.  The Jets improved to 4–6 while the Rams fell to 3–6–1.

Week 12: vs. New England Patriots (Thanksgiving Day game)

The Jets were thoroughly dominated by the Patriots; they scored five touchdowns in the second quarter, three of them in a span of 52 seconds of game clock. The first came on an 83-yard pass to Shane Vereen after the Patriots recovered a Shonn Greene fumble. On the Jets' ensuing drive, Mark Sanchez fumbled after running into lineman Brandon Moore and Steve Gregory ran back a 32-yard score. The play later became known as the "butt fumble". The third touchdown came on the ensuing kickoff, Devin McCourty forced Joe McKnight to fumble, which Julian Edelman recovered and returned for a third touchdown (he later caught a 56-yard touchdown pass from Tom Brady).

With the huge loss, the Jets fell to 4–7, and were swept by Bill Belichick's Patriots for the sixth time.

Week 13: vs. Arizona Cardinals

Mark Sanchez was benched in the fourth quarter and Greg McElroy threw the winning touchdown.   The switch escalated brewing controversy over Sanchez's declining play.

Week 14: at Jacksonville Jaguars

The Jets improved to 6–7 and stayed alive in the playoff race after twice intercepting Chad Henne, who'd replaced faltering sophomore Blaine Gabbert four weeks earlier.  The Jets had 166 rushing yards and two scores, limiting Mark Sanchez to just nineteen throws for 111 yards.

Week 15: at Tennessee Titans

Chris Johnson ran in a 94-yard touchdown while following a Jeff Cumberland touchdown catch for the Jets Jake Locker ran in a 13-yard score.  Mark Sanchez threw four interceptions yet a short Titans punt gave the Jets the ball inside the Titans 25 in the final minute.   The Jets blew the snap and the Titans fell on the ball, ending the game.

With the loss, the Jets not only fell to 6–8, but got mathematically eliminated from postseason contention for the second straight season.

Tim Tebow entered the game for the first time since Week 10 and made what turned out to be his final plays with the Jets, missing on his only pass while rushing three times for fifteen yards.

Week 16: vs. San Diego Chargers

Due to a decrease in popularity for the game, it was flexed out of Sunday Night Football on NBC and rescheduled to 1:00 PM on CBS. Following the loss to the Titans Rex Ryan announced that Greg McElroy would start for the Jets against the Chargers.  Following a 63-yard Micheal Spurlock punt return touchdown McElroy led back to back scoring drives ending in 1-yard Shonn Greene touchdowns.  The Chargers took over the game in the third quarter with two Philip Rivers touchdowns and a Nick Novak field goal while McElroy was intercepted once and strip-sacked once.

With the loss, the Jets fell to 6–9, their first losing season since 2007.

Week 17: at Buffalo Bills

The Jets' plan to start Greg McElroy was changed due to a concussion he'd suffered.   As a result, Mark Sanchez started and managed 205 passing yards but was intercepted by Bryan Scott in the first quarter for the Bills' first touchdown of the game.  The Jets led 9–7 in the second quarter before the Bills scored three unanswered touchdowns, including one from ex-Jet Brad Smith.  Tim Tebow suited up for the game but was never used.  It was the first win for the Bills in the rivalry since 2009.

Statistics

Regular season statistical leaders

Statistical league rankings
Total Offense (YPG): 308.9 (29th)
Passing (YPG): 194 (32nd)
Rushing (YPG): 115.2 (12th)
Total Defense (YPG): 336.0 (10th)
Passing (YPG): 198 (32nd)
Rushing (YPG): 137.7 (29th)

Stats correct through week 14.

See also
List of NFL teams affected by internal conflict

Notes and references

External links

 
2012 New York Jets at Pro Football Reference

New York Jets
New York Jets seasons
New York Jets season
21st century in East Rutherford, New Jersey
Meadowlands Sports Complex